Ne m'abandonne pas (French: Do Not Abandon Me) is a French TV movie directed by Xavier Durringer, which was broadcast on 3 February 2016 on France 2. The film deals with the topic of young French Muslims who are radicalized and encouraged to go to Syria to join the civil war.

Synopsis 
A French woman experiences her worst nightmare when she discovers that her 17-year-old daughter has been radicalized and plans to travel to Syria to meet her new husband, a jihadist she met online. In order to prevent this, the mother decides to completely isolate her daughter.

Cast 
 Lina El Arabi as Chama
 Samia Sassi as Inès, Chama's mother
 Sami Bouajila as Sami, Chama's father
 Marc Lavoine as Adrien, Louis' father
 Léo Legrand as Louis, Chama's boyfriend, who is fighting in Syria
 Tassadit Mandi as Chama's grandmother
 Sofia Lesaffre as Yasmina, Chama's best friend
 Louise Szpindel as Manon, an ex-convert back from Syria
 Virgile M'Fouilou as Lieutenant Logley
 Meriem Serbah as Nora
 Bachir Tliti as Benjamin
 Évelyne El Garby Klaï as Djemila, Sami's companion
 Théo Taggueb as Noam, Chams's half-brother
 Zoé Daddi-Bourcy as Louisa, Chama's half-sister
 Clara Pirali as Carole
 Nadir Louatib as Omar, a friend of Louis
 Louis-Marie Audubert as the postman

Awards and recognition

Wins 
 2017 International Emmy Awards: Best TV Movie/Miniseries
 2017 Monte Carlo TV Festival: Best Long Fiction Program
 2016 Seoul International Drama Awards: Best Actress for Samia Sassi
 2016 Seoul International Drama Awards: Best TV Movie

Nominations 
 Monte Carlo TV Festival 2017: Outstanding Actor in a Miniseries for Marc Lavoine

Legacy 
A petition was launched in 2016 to request the broadcast of the film in all French high schools. Addressed to Najat Vallaud-Belkacem, the French Minister of National Education, the petition succeeded in reaching its objective of 43,172 signatures, and the Minister responded favourably to the project.

References

External links 
 

2016 television films
2016 films
French television films
Drama television films
Films directed by Xavier Durringer